Brian Loftin (born April 4, 1972 in Kansas City, Missouri) is a retired American soccer forward and was the commissioner of the Xtreme Soccer League.  He played one season in Major League Soccer with the Tampa Bay Mutiny, as well as several seasons in the USISL.  However, his greatest fame as a player came in eight seasons of indoor soccer where he was a consistent scoring threat with the Kansas City Attack and Milwaukee Wave.  He also earned twelve caps, scoring five goals, with the United States national futsal team.

Player
Loftin graduated in 1990 from The Barstow School, an independent private school in Kansas City, Missouri, before attending the U.S. Military Academy at West Point for two years where he was a 1992 All Patriot League soccer player. He transferred to the University of Evansville in 1993.  After completing his collegiate eligibility in the fall of 1994, Loftin attended an open tryout with the Kansas City Attack of the National Professional Soccer League.  He impressed the coaches and was signed to a contract, becoming a regular on the Attack front line for four seasons.  In 1997, he played for the Carolina Dynamo in the USISL.  In March 1998, the Tampa Bay Mutiny selected Loftin in the first round (second overall) in the 1998 MLS Supplemental Draft.  He played eight games for the Mutiny that season.  He also played five games for the Charleston Battery of USISL.  In April 1999, he signed with the Milwaukee Rampage of the USL A-League.  He would play outdoor summer soccer with the Rampage through the 2000 season. In 2000, he was First Team All League with the Rampage.  Loftin also signed with the Milwaukee Wave of the NPSL and remained with them for four seasons before retiring in 2003.  One of his most notable goals came in the Game 5 of the 2000 NPSL finals, in which Loftin executed a spectacular bicycle kick to score.  In his last two seasons, the Wave played in the Major Indoor Soccer League.  Loftin also earned twelve caps, scoring five goals, with the U.S. national futsal team between 1996 and 2000.

Executive
In between his playing career with the Wave and becoming commissioner of the XSL, Loftin was the GM/CEO of the Chicago Storm.

References

Living people
American men's futsal players
American soccer players
American soccer chairmen and investors
North Carolina Fusion U23 players
Charleston Battery players
Evansville Purple Aces men's soccer players
Kansas City Attack (NPSL) players
Major League Soccer players
Milwaukee Rampage players
Milwaukee Wave players
Tampa Bay Mutiny players
1972 births
A-League (1995–2004) players
Tampa Bay Mutiny draft picks
Association football forwards
Army Black Knights men's soccer players